Bramwell William "Dick" Hodder (15 November 1923 – 12 September 2006) was a British geographer and academic, specialising in African studies.

Having served in the British Army during the Second World War, he studied geography at Oriel College, Oxford and the University of London. He then began a long academic career stretching across three continents: he was a lecturer at the University of Malaya in Singapore (1952–1956), the University of Ibadan in Nigeria (1956–1963), the University of Glasgow in Scotland (1963–1964), before joining Queen Mary College, University of London in England in 1964 as a Reader. He moved to the University of London's School of Oriental and African Studies in 1970 as Professor of Geography, retiring in 1983 and being appointed emeritus professor.

Hodder was married three times. Among his five children and two step-daughters is the archaeologist and academic Ian Hodder.

Selected works

References

1923 births
2006 deaths
British geographers
British Africanists
Regional geographers
Alumni of Oriel College, Oxford
Alumni of the University of London
Academic staff of the National University of Singapore
Academic staff of the University of Ibadan
Academics of the University of Glasgow
Academics of Queen Mary University of London
Academics of SOAS University of London
British Army personnel of World War II